The Big Bubble is an album released by American art rock group The Residents in 1985. The album is presented as the debut of fictional garage rock band "the Big Bubble", composed of four "Cross" band members – "Cross" being the resulting mixture between the Mole Trilogy's two contrasting factions, the Moles and the Chubs.

The album was subtitled Part Four of the Mole Trilogy – it was decided to extend the trilogy into a hexalogy, in which odd-numbered parts would detail the plot while even-numbered parts would elaborate on the cultural aspect of the two warring factions in the story. However, The Big Bubble was the last finished work related to the project before it was cancelled due to sheer disinterest and focus on other projects.

Music 
The music on The Big Bubble is designed for a garage rock setting – instrumentation consists of guitars, drums, vocals and keyboards – and most of the album's lyrics are gibberish, presented as "the forbidden language of the Mohelmot" (one of the two races involved in the story). Vocals were recorded before the instruments to achieve a "live" sound.

Artwork 
The album cover of The Big Bubble is actually presented "inside" another cover – it's implied that the album is actually titled Part Four of the Mole Trilogy, while presenting the cover for the self-titled album of a fictional band called the Big Bubble. In similar fashion, the album's back cover shows the fictional album's back cover, and the gatefold spread shows the fictional album's gatefold spread. The same applies for the record labels (the fictional album is published by "Black Shroud" Records).

The fictional album's front cover generated attention due to its showing of four unmasked band members – it was rumored that these band members were, in fact, the Residents. However, this rumor was quickly denied by the band.

Reception 

The Big Bubble is one of the Residents' most polarizing albums. Critical reception was heavily mixed. While writer Cole Gagne, in his book Sonic Transports, considers the album "brilliant," writer Ian Shirley says in his book Meet the Residents that the album was "treading water."

Despite this, the album was surprisingly successful in Japan, where it was being distributed by Wave Records. As a result, Wave requested that the Residents perform in Tokyo, proposing to cover all expenses. This performance was developed into the 13th Anniversary Show which eventually also toured Europe, Australia and the United States.

Track listing
All tracks written by the Residents.

The fictional sleeve lists all songs as written by Frank Leone (guitarist) and Ramsey Whiten (drummer/singer), except "Fear for the Future", written by Paul Sage (keyboardist).

2019 pREServed edition (Mole Box) 
A deluxe box set pertaining to the entire Mole Trilogy concept was released in 2019. It contained newly remastered editions of Mark of the Mole, The Tunes of Two Cities and The Big Bubble, as well as recordings of the Mole Show and a sixth disc of miscellaneous recordings related to the project. Disc Three is shown here for its relevance.

Personnel

As listed on the Residents sleeve 

 The Residents – performance
 Raoul N. Di Seimbote – backing vocals
 Brian Seff – backing vocals
 Ray Hanna – backing vocals

As listed on the Big Bubble sleeve 

 Frank Leone – electric guitar, backing vocals
 Ramsey Whiten – lead vocals, percussion
 Paul Sage – grand piano, string synthesizer, backing vocals
 Alex Beason – electric guitar, backing vocals

References 

Big Bubble: Part Four of the Mole Trilogy, The
Big Bubble: Part Four of the Mole Trilogy, The
Ralph Records albums